Somatina irregularis is a moth of the  family Geometridae. It is found in Nigeria.

References

Endemic fauna of Nigeria
Moths described in 1898
Scopulini
Insects of West Africa
Moths of Africa